Como is an unincorporated community in New Madrid County, in the U.S. state of Missouri.

History
Como was laid out in 1879 when the railroad was extended to that point. A post office called Como was established in 1879, and remained in operation until 1938. The community was named after Como, in Italy.

References

Unincorporated communities in New Madrid County, Missouri
Unincorporated communities in Missouri